The 13th Pan American Games were held in Winnipeg, Manitoba, Canada from July 23 to August 8, 1999.

Medalists
The following competitors from Brazil won medals at the games. In the by discipline sections below, medalists' names are bolded.

Athletics

Men
Track & road events

Field events

Women
Track & road events

Field events

Combined events – Heptathlon

Badminton

Men

Women

Mixed

Baseball

Summary

Basketball

Summary

Boxing

Men

Bowling

Canoeing

Sprint
Men

Diving

Men

Women

Equestrian

Dressage

Three-Day

Jumping

Gymnastics

Artistic

Men
Team & Individual Qualification

Qualification Legend: Q = Qualified to apparatus final

Individual finals

Women
Team & Individual Qualification

Qualification Legend: Q = Qualified to apparatus final

Individual finals

Rhythmic

Group

Handball

Summary

Modern pentathlon

Roller sports

Figure

Hockey

Summary

Canada disqualified due to doping of goalie

Rowing

Men

Women

Sailing

Men

Women

Open

Shooting

Men
Pistol and rifle

Shotgun

Women
Pistol and rifle

Shotgun

Swimming

Brazil has qualified 26 athletes total, 14 men and 12 women:

Men

Women

Synchronized swimming

Brazil has qualified a full team of nine athletes.

Tennis

Men

Women

Triathlon

Brazil qualified a triathlon team of five athletes (two men and three women).

Volleyball

Beach

Indoor

Summary

Water polo

Summary

See also
Brazil at the 2000 Summer Olympics

References
 Official website of the Brazilian Olympic Committee

Nations at the 1999 Pan American Games
Pan American Games
1999